The 1985 European Rallycross Championship season was the tenth season of the FIA European Rallycross Championship under that name and the thirteenth season overall since it began as the Embassy/ERA European Rallycross Championship. It was held across nine rounds starting at the Thermoton-Ring in Austria on March 31 and ending at the Eurocircuit in the Netherlands on October 13.

The champions were Anders Norstedt (Division 1) who defended his title and Matti Alamäki (Division 2).

Calendar

Drivers

Div.1

Div. 2

Standings

Div 1

References
Season overview

1985 in motorsport
1985 in European sport
European Rallycross Championship seasons